The right to work is the concept  that people have a human right to work, or engage in productive employment, and should not be prevented from doing so. The right to work is enshrined in the Universal Declaration of Human Rights and recognized in international human rights law through its inclusion in the International Covenant on Economic, Social and Cultural Rights, where the right to work emphasizes economic, social and cultural development. Right to work was also enshrined as a fundamental right of the citizen in the constitution of the Soviet Union.

The Human Rights Measurement Initiative measures the right to work for countries around the world, based on their level of income.

Definition
The Universal Declaration of Human Rights states in Article 23.1:

The International Covenant on Economic, Social and Cultural Rights states in Part III, Article 6:

The African Charter on Human and Peoples' Rights also recognises the right, emphasising conditions and pay, i.e. labor rights. Article 15, states:

History
The phrase "the right to work" was coined by the French socialist leader Louis Blanc in light of the social turmoil of the early 19th century and rising unemployment in the wake of the 1846 financial crisis which led up to the French Revolution of 1848. The right to property was a crucial demand in early quests for political freedom and equality, and against feudal control of property. Property can serve as the basis for the entitlements that ensure the realisation of the right to an adequate standard of living and it was only property owners which were initially granted civil and political rights, such as the right to vote. Because not everybody is a property owner, the right to work was enshrined to allow everybody to attain an adequate standard of living. Today discrimination on the basis of property ownership is recognised as a serious threat to the equal enjoyment of human rights by all and non-discrimination clauses in international human rights instruments frequently include property as a ground on the basis of which discrimination is prohibited (see the right to equality before the law).

Criticism
The Right to Be Lazy (1883) by Paul Lafargue, a French Marxist, criticized the concept of a right to work. He wrote: "And to think that the sons of the heroes of the Terror have allowed themselves to be degraded by the religion of work, to the point of accepting, since 1848, as a revolutionary conquest, the law limiting factory labor to twelve hours. They proclaim as a revolutionary principle the Right to Work. Shame to the French proletariat! Only slaves would have been capable of such baseness."

See also

References

External links

 
Human rights by issue
Labor rights